Saint-Louis-du-Nord is a commune in the Saint-Louis-du-Nord Arrondissement, in the Nord-Ouest department of Haiti.
It has 69,592 inhabitants.

References

Populated places in Nord-Ouest (department)
Communes of Haiti